Sordariomycetes is a class of fungi in the subdivision Pezizomycotina (Ascomycota).  Sordariomycetes is from the Latin sordes (filth) because some species grow in animal feces, though growth habits vary widely across the class.

In 2013, it consisted of 3 subclasses, 12 orders, 600 genera and 3000 species, Then by 2015, it had 3 subclasses, 28 orders, 90 families and 1344 genera. This has increased to 4 subclasses and 54 orders.

Sordariomycetes generally produce their asci in perithecial fruiting bodies.

Sordariomycetes are also known as Pyrenomycetes, from the Greek  - 'the stone of a fruit' - because of the usually somewhat tough texture of their tissue.

Sordariomycetes possess great variability in morphology, growth form, and habitat. Most have perithecial (flask-shaped) fruiting bodies, but ascomata can be less frequently cleistothecial (such as in the genera Anixiella, Apodus, Boothiella, Thielavia and Zopfiella). Fruiting bodies may be solitary or gregarious, superficial, or immersed within stromata or tissues of the substrates and can be light to bright or black. Members of this group can grow in soil, dung, leaf litter, and decaying wood as decomposers, as well as being fungal parasites, and insect, human, and plant pathogens.

Subclasses and Orders
As accepted by Wijayawardene et al. 2020.

Subclass Diaporthomycetidae

Annulatascales 
Atractosporales 
Calosphaeriales 
Diaporthales 
Distoseptisporales 
Jobellisiales 
Magnaporthales 
Myrmecridiales  
Ophiostomatales 
Pararamichloridiales 
Phomatosporales 
Sporidesmiales 
Tirisporellales 
Togniniales 
Trichosphaeriales 
Xenospadicoidales

Subclass Hypocreomycetidae

Coronophorales 
Falcocladiales
Glomerellales
Hypocreales
Jobellisiales
Melanosporales
Microascales (Halosphaeriales)
Pararamichloridiales
Parasympodiellales
Spathulosporales
Torpedosporales

Subclass Lulworthiomycetidae
Koralionastetales (contains family Koralionastetaceae with genera; Koralionastes and Pontogeneia)
Lulworthiales

Subclass Pisorisporiomycetidae
Pisorisporiales (contains family Pisorisporiaceae and genera; Achroceratosphaeria and Pisorisporium)

Subclass Savoryellomycetidae
Conioscyphales (contains family Conioscyphaceae and genus Conioscypha)
Fuscosporellales (contains family Fuscosporellaceae with genera; Bactrodesmiastrum, Fuscosporella, Mucispora, Parafuscosporella, Plagiascoma and Pseudoascotaiwania)
Pleurotheciales (contains family Pleurotheciaceae with genera; Adelosphaeria, Anapleurothecium, Helicoascotaiwania, Melanotrigonum, Neomonodictys, Phaeoisaria, Pleurotheciella, Pleurothecium and Sterigmatobotrys)
Savoryellales (contains family Savoryellaceae with genera; Ascotaiwania, Canalisporium, Dematiosporium, Monotosporella, Neoascotaiwania and Savoryella)

Subclass Sordariomycetidae

Batistiales
Boliniales
Cephalothecales
Chaetosphaeriales
Coniochaetales
Meliolales
Paradiplococciales
Phyllachorales
Pseudodactylariales
Sordariales

Subclass Xylariomycetidae
Amphisphaeriales (includes Apiosporaceae )
Delonicicolales
Xylariales

Order incertae sedis

Amplistromatales
Tracyllalales
Vermiculariopsiellales

Familia incertae sedis
These are families in the Sordariomycetes whose taxonomic affinities are not sufficiently well known to be placed in any order.

Batistiaceae
Obryzaceae
Papulosaceae
Plectosphaerellaceae
Thyridiaceae (contains Balzania, Mattirolia, Pleurocytospora, Sinosphaeria, Thyridium, Thyronectria and Thyronectroidea) 
Vialaeaceae

Genera incertae sedis
These 108 genera within the Sordariomycetes have an uncertain taxonomic placement (incertae sedis), according to the 2007 Outline of Ascomycota. A question mark preceding the genus name means the placement of that genus within this order is uncertain.
Abyssomyces –
Acerbiella –
Acrospermoides –
Ameromassaria –
Amphisphaerellula –
Amphisphaerina –
Amphorulopsis –
Amylis –
Anthostomaria –
Anthostomellina –
Apharia –
Apodothina –
Apogaeumannomyces –
Aquadulciospora –
Aquamarina –
Aropsiclus –
Ascorhiza –
Ascoyunnania –
Assoa –
Aulospora –
Azbukinia –
Bactrosphaeria –
Barrina –
Biporispora –
Bombardiastrum –
Brenesiella –
Byrsomyces –
Byssotheciella –
Caleutypa –
Calosphaeriopsis –
Caproniella –
Chaetoamphisphaeria –
Ciliofusospora –
Clypeoceriospora –
Clypeosphaerulina –
Cryptoascus –
Cryptomycina –
Cryptovalsa –
Cucurbitopsis –
Curvatispora –
Dasysphaeria –
Delpinoella –
Diacrochordon –
Dontuzia –
Dryosphaera –
Endoxylina –
Esfandiariomyces –
Frondisphaera –
Glabrotheca –
Heliastrum –
Hyaloderma –
Hydronectria –
Hypotrachynicola –
Immersisphaeria –
Iraniella –
Khuskia –
Konenia –
Kravtzevia –
Kurssanovia –
Lecythium –
Leptosacca –
Leptosphaerella –
Leptosporina –
Lyonella –
Mangrovispora –
Melomastia –
Microcyclephaeria –
Mirannulata –
Monosporascus –
Myrmecridium –
?Naumovela –
?Neocryptospora –
Neolamya –
Neothyridaria –
Oceanitis –
Ophiomassaria –
Ornatispora –
Pareutypella –
Phomatospora –
Phyllocelis –
Plectosphaerella –
Pleocryptospora –
Pleosphaeria –
Pontogeneia –
Porodiscus –
Protocucurbitaria –
Pulvinaria –
Pumilus –
Rehmiomycella –
Rhamphosphaeria –
Rhizophila –
Rimaconus –
Rhopographella –
Rhynchosphaeria –
Rivulicola –
Romellina –
Saccardoëlla –
Sarcopyrenia –
Sartorya –
Scharifia –
Scoliocarpon –
Scotiosphaeria –
Servaziella –
Sporoctomorpha –
Stearophora –
Stegophorella –
Stellosetifera –
Stomatogenella –

Sungaiicola –
Synsphaeria –
Tamsiniella –
Thelidiella –
Thyridella –
Thyrotheca –
Trichospermella –
Trichosphaeropsis –
Vleugelia –
Zignoina

References

Further reading

External links
 Tree of Life Sordariomycetes 

 
Fungus classes
Lichen classes
Taxa described in 1997